Slough Borough Council is the local authority for the Borough of Slough, in Berkshire, England. Slough is a unitary authority, having the powers of a county and district council combined. Berkshire is purely a ceremonial county, with no administrative responsibilities.

History
Slough's first local authority was the Slough Local Board, established in 1863. This became Slough Urban District Council in 1894. In 1938 the town was granted a charter of incorporation as a municipal borough, with the council then taking the name Slough Corporation. The municipal borough was abolished under the Local Government Act 1972 on 1 April 1974, and replaced by Slough Borough Council, when the town was also transferred from Buckinghamshire to Berkshire. On 1 April 1998, Slough Borough Council became a unitary authority when Berkshire County Council was abolished, taking over the county council's former functions.

Governance
The council has adopted the leader and cabinet form of governance. Labour has held a majority of the seats on the council since 2008, and the leader of the council since 2017 has been Labour's James Swindlehurst. The post of mayor is largely ceremonial in Slough and tends to be held by a different councillor each year. The mayor for 2022-2023 is Dilbagh Parmar, a Labour councillor.

Premises
Slough Town Hall at 19 Bath Road was built in 1937 and served as the council's headquarters until 2011. The council was then temporarily based at St Martin's Place at 51 Bath Road from 2011 to 2019, holding meetings at various venues in the town whilst looking for a new home closer to the town centre. In July 2018 the council bought Observatory House at 25 Windsor Road for a reported £41.3 million and converted it to become the council's main offices and meeting place, with the first council meetings in the building being held in September 2019.

Bankruptcy (2021)
On 2 July 2021, Slough Borough Council issued a notice under Section 114 of the Local Government Finance Act 1988, having the effect of preventing any new expenditure on non-statutory services, following serious financial problems being identified. In October 2021, the government announced plans to appoint external commissioners to help run the council after a series of reports highlighted major problems at the local authority.

Wards of Slough
The borough is divided into fifteen wards. Most wards elect three councillors, with the exceptions being Colnbrook with Poyle, which elects two councillors, and Foxborough, which elects one councillor. There are 42 councillors in total. The current set of wards came into force for the 2014 election, and are:

Baylis and Stoke
Britwell and Northborough
Central
Chalvey
Cippenham Green
Cippenham Meadows
Colnbrook with Poyle
Elliman
Farnham
Foxborough
Haymill and Lynch Hill
Langley Kederminster
Langley St Mary's
Upton
Wexham Lea

See also
Slough Borough Council elections for historic election results and former council composition.
List of mayors of Slough
Municipal Borough of Slough for more detail on the pre-1974 local authorities covering the town.

References

Government and politics of Slough
Unitary authority councils of England
Leader and cabinet executives
Local education authorities in England
Local authorities in Berkshire
Billing authorities in England